Hardmoney is an unincorporated community in Graves County, Kentucky, United States.

A post office was established in the community in 1880 by John H. Ballance, but it closed in 1900. Hardmoney is named for the political controversy of the day over the gold standard.

See also 
 Place names considered unusual

References 

Unincorporated communities in Graves County, Kentucky